= Lichtiger colitis activity index =

The Lichtiger Colitis Activity Index is a tool used in clinical research to measure quantify the impact of symptoms of ulcerative colitis.
